The Blériot-SPAD S.XXI was a prototype fighter plane built by SPAD in the late 1910s, derived from the Spad S.XIII.

Specifications

See also

References

Fighter aircraft
Biplanes
1910s French fighter aircraft
S.XXI
Single-engined tractor aircraft
Aircraft first flown in 1918